Roberto Robaina González (born 18 March 1956) was the Foreign Minister of Cuba from 1993 until 1999.

Career
In 1993, at the age of 37 he became Foreign Minister. In 1999 he was removed on accusations of wrongdoing in his relationships with foreign business leaders and officials.

He studied Pedagogy, with emphasis in Mathematics. His approach to the world of fine arts is produced through his personal involvement as a hobby in the design of visual propaganda for working with students and youth.

Since 2004 he is an independent artist, dedicated to painting, photography and graphic design.

Much of his work is in private collections in countries like Spain, Mexico, Italy, Panama, Venezuela, the Dominican Republic, United States, Puerto Rico, Argentina, Uruguay, Chile, France, Switzerland, Russia, Canada, Colombia and Cuba.

References

http://www.jornada.unam.mx/2011/08/23/cultura/a04n1cul

External links

 Fine Art America

Cuban diplomats
Foreign ministers of Cuba
1956 births
Living people
Communist Party of Cuba politicians
People from Pinar del Río
1990s in Cuba
20th-century Cuban politicians